There are two rivers named Do Sono River or Rio do Sono Brazil:

 Do Sono River (Minas Gerais)
 Do Sono River (Tocantins)